Jean Queval (1913–1990) was a French translator, writer, journalist, film critic and founding member of Oulipo.

1913 births
1990 deaths
20th-century French writers
Oulipo members
20th-century French translators
20th-century French male writers
French male non-fiction writers